is a Japanese manga series written and illustrated by Souta Kuwahara. It was serialized in Square Enix's Monthly Shōnen Gangan from April 2007 to September 2020 and published in 18 volumes.

Publication
The series is written and illustrated by Souta Kuwahara. It started serialization in Monthly Shōnen Gangan on April 12, 2007. In March 2015, it was announced the series would be going on hiatus due to the author's health. Five years later, the series finished on September 12, 2020, with the release of the last two chapters in the final volumes.

In July 2015, Yen Press announced they licensed the series for English publication digitally.

Volume list

Reception
Pilau Daures from  praised the series for its unique style and artwork. Koiwai from Manga News was more critical, stating that the series was "nice but lackluster [overall]". Unlike Koiwai, Faustine Lillaz from Planete BD was more positive, calling the series "simple but charming".

References

External links
 

Demons in anime and manga
Fantasy anime and manga
Gangan Comics manga
Shōnen manga
Yen Press titles